Keith Conlon, LL.B. 1968, B.A. 1968 (University of Adelaide), OAM, is a veteran Australian broadcaster based in Adelaide.

Conlon previously presented talk radio station 5AA's breakfast program with Jane Reilly, and formerly with Jon Blake, John Kenneally and Tony Pilkington. He is also the current chairman of the Crows Foundation for children in need.

In 1971, The University of Adelaide's Department of Adult Education appointed Conlon as the Producer/Manager of its new community radio station which commenced broadcasting as VL5UV on 28 June 1972.

He also formerly hosted Postcards SA on the Nine Network from 1995 until it was cancelled in November 2011. Conlon has also worked at ABC 891 where his former colleague John Kenneally was his producer. He presented the weeknight edition of ABC News in South Australia from 1989 to 1992.
In 2012 Conlon was teamed with Jane Reilly and he retired in 2013.

Conlon has had a life-long interest in South Australian history, and in December 2017 he was appointed to a 3-year term as chair of the South Australian Heritage Council, an independent advisory body on heritage matters to the Minister for Sustainability, Environment and Conservation, and the Minister for Planning.

References

Year of birth missing (living people)
Australian radio personalities
ABC News (Australia) presenters
Living people
Adelaide Law School alumni
People educated at St Peter's College, Adelaide
Journalists from South Australia